Louis V, Count Palatine of the Rhine (German: Ludwig V. von der Pfalz) (2 July 1478, in Heidelberg – 16 March 1544, in Heidelberg), also Louis the Pacific, was a member of the Wittelsbach dynasty was prince elector of the  Palatinate.
His parents were Philip, Elector Palatine, and Margaret, a daughter of Louis IX, Duke of Bavaria-Landshut.

He converted to Lutheranism in the 1530s.

Biography
Louis succeeded his father in 1508 and had to cope with the consequences of the lost Landshut War of Succession against Albert IV, Duke of Bavaria. With the Imperial Diet of Augsburg in 1518 Louis achieved the annulment of the Imperial Ban against the Palatinate. In 1519 Louis voted for Charles V, Holy Roman Emperor.

During the German Peasants' War, Louis found himself surrounded by 8,000 armed peasants in Neustadt, where he invited their leaders to dinner and complied with their demands.

Louis married Sibylle, daughter of Albert IV, Duke of Bavaria but had no children by her. He was succeeded by his brother Frederick.

Ancestors

References

1478 births
1544 deaths
House of Wittelsbach
Prince-electors of the Palatinate
Imperial vicars
Burials at the Church of the Holy Spirit, Heidelberg